The Valdostan regional election of 1968 took place on 21 April 1968.

The alliance of 1966 was initially confirmed, but political instability arose after a first change in 1969, until the local Christian Democracy broke up in 1970.

Results

Sources: Regional Council of Aosta Valley and Istituto Cattaneo

Elections in Aosta Valley
1968 elections in Italy